Mansa Musa III, also known as Foamed Musa or Sérébandjougou was the 13th mansa (emperor) of the Mali Empire.  Little is known about him or his reign other than it started around the middle of the 15th century during the empire's decline.  He first enters recorded history during the empire's war against the Fula Wassoulounké in the 1440s.  He and his younger brother liberated the newly settled area of Dioma, and Sérébandjougou was crowned mansa shortly after.  He was succeeded by his brother Ouali II.

See also
Mali Empire
Keita Dynasty

References

Mansas of Mali
People of the Mali Empire
15th-century monarchs in Africa
Keita family